The following is a list of notable tsunamis in Europe.

Causes
Most of the tsunamis that have occurred within Europe have happened in the Mediterranean Sea because in the Mediterranean Sea there are earthquakes, submarine landslide and volcanoes. Most of the earthquakes occur on the Eurasian Plate but earthquakes and submarine landslide also occur in western Europe like France, Norway and the United Kingdom which have been struck by tsunamis.

Tsunamis

See also
 Tsunamis in the United Kingdom
 Historic tsunamis

References

Europe
Tsunamis